Anupam is a series of supercomputers designed and developed by Bhabha Atomic Research Centre (BARC) for their internal usages. It is mainly used for molecular dynamical simulations, reactor physics, theoretical physics, computational chemistry, computational fluid dynamics, and finite element analysis.

The latest in the series is Anupam-Aganya.

Introduction 

BARC carries out inter-disciplinary and multi-disciplinary R&D activities covering a wide range of disciplines in physical sciences, chemical sciences, biological sciences and engineering. Expertise at BARC covers the entire spectrum of science and technology.

BARC has started development of supercomputers under the ANUPAM project in 1991 and till date, has developed more than 20 different computer systems. All ANUPAM systems have employed parallel processing as the underlying philosophy and MIMD (Multiple Instruction Multiple Data) as the core architecture. BARC, being a multidisciplinary research organization, has a large pool of scientists and engineers, working in various aspects of nuclear science and technology and thus are involved in doing diverse nature of computations.

To keep the gestation period short, the parallel computers were built with commercially available off-the-shelf components, with BARC's major contribution being in the areas of system integration, system engineering, system software development, application software development, fine tuning of the system and support to a diverse set of users.

The series started with a small four-processor system in 1991 with a sustained performance of 34 MFlops. Keeping in mind the ever increasing demands from the users, new systems have been built regularly with increasing computational power. The latest in the series of supercomputers is the 4608 core ANUPAM-Adhya system developed in 2010-11, with a sustained performance of 47 TeraFLOPS on the standard High Performance Linpack (HPL) benchmark. The system is in production mode and released to users.

In 2001, BARC achieved a new milestone in developing a supercomputer 20-25 times faster than the fastest computer built by other institutes in the country when it commissioned ANUPAM-PENTIUM.

Anupam Systems

See also 
 PARAM
 SAGA-220, a 220 TeraFLOP supercomputer built by ISRO
 EKA
 Wipro Supernova
 Supercomputing in India

References

Supercomputers
Information technology in India
Supercomputing in India